Broadway is a town in Rockingham County, Virginia, United States. The population was 3,691 at the 2010 census. It is included in the Harrisonburg Metropolitan Statistical Area.

Geography
Broadway is located at  (38.611954, -78.799192).

According to the United States Census Bureau, the town has a total area of 1.8 square miles (4.7 km²), all of it land.

Transportation

The primary roads serving Broadway are Virginia State Route 42 and Virginia State Route 259, which run concurrently for a short distance within the town limits. SR 42 connects north to Timberville, where it connects to Virginia State Route 211, and south to Harrisonburg, where it connects with U.S. Route 33. SR 259 connects east to Interstate 81 and west to West Virginia. An alternate routing of SR 259 also serves as a main road within Broadway.

Climate
The climate in this area is characterized by hot, humid summers and generally mild to cool winters.  According to the Köppen Climate Classification system, Broadway has a humid subtropical climate, abbreviated "Cfa" on climate maps.

Demographics

At the 2000 census there were 2,192 people, 882 households, and 610 families in the town. The population density was 1,202.5 people per square mile (465.0/km²). There were 976 housing units at an average density of 535.4 per square mile (207.1/km²).  The racial makeup of the town was 97.22% White, 0.64% African American, 0.23% Native American, 0.68% Asian, 0.59% from other races, and 0.64% from two or more races. Hispanic or Latino of any race were 3.06%.

Of the 882 households 31.6% had children under the age of 18 living with them, 54.6% were married couples living together, 9.9% had a female householder with no husband present, and 30.8% were non-families. 25.9% of households were one person and 9.9% were one person aged 65 or older. The average household size was 2.42 and the average family size was 2.91.

The age distribution was 24.0% under the age of 18, 8.8% from 18 to 24, 30.4% from 25 to 44, 22.6% from 45 to 64, and 14.2% 65 or older. The median age was 37 years. For every 100 females there were 90.1 males. For every 100 females age 18 and over, there were 89.1 males.

The median household income was $40,167 and the median family income  was $45,066. Males had a median income of $27,181 versus $20,930 for females. The per capita income for the town was $18,274. About 5.1% of families and 8.2% of the population were below the poverty line, including 10.7% of those under age 18 and 11.9% of those age 65 or over.

Notable places
Bethlehem Church, Lincoln Homestead and Cemetery, Linville Creek Bridge, Sites House, and Tunker House are listed on the National Register of Historic Places.

Notable people
Vakhtang Jordania, Georgian defector and composer who resided in Broadway until his death in 2005

Athletics
The town is home to the Broadway Bruins, a baseball team in the Rockingham County Baseball League. The Bruins play home games at Broadway High School's baseball field.
The 2014 Broadway High School girls' basketball team lost to cross-county rival Spotswood High School 56-49 in the Class 3A state finals.
The 2017 Broadway High School girls' basketball team won the 2017 Class 3a state championship, 51-41, over Magna Vista High School.

References

Towns in Rockingham County, Virginia
Towns in Virginia